William Knox Bowe (29 January 1879 – 11 March 1920) was an Australian rules footballer who played with Melbourne in the Victorian Football League (VFL).

Notes

External links 

1879 births
Australian rules footballers from Victoria (Australia)
Melbourne Football Club players
1920 deaths